Hyposmocoma lupella is a species of moth of the family Cosmopterigidae. It was first described by Lord Walsingham in 1907. It is endemic to the Hawaiian island of Kauai.

The moth's food source is unknown, but the larvae are expected to be found on dead wood and are presumed to be case-makers.

External links

lupella
Endemic moths of Hawaii
Moths described in 1907
Taxa named by Thomas de Grey, 6th Baron Walsingham